The 1947 U.S. National Championships (now known as the US Open) was a tennis tournament that took place on the outdoor grass courts at the West Side Tennis Club, Forest Hills in New York City, United States. The tournament ran from 6 September until 14 September. It was the 67th staging of the U.S. National Championships, and the fourth Grand Slam tennis event of the year.

Finals

Men's singles

 Jack Kramer defeated  Frank Parker  4–6, 2–6, 6–1, 6–0, 6–3

Women's singles

 Louise Brough defeated  Margaret Osborne  8–6, 4–6, 6–1

Men's doubles
 Jack Kramer /  Ted Schroeder defeated  Bill Talbert /  Bill Sidwell 6–4, 7–5, 6–3

Women's doubles
 Louise Brough /  Margaret Osborne defeated  Patricia Todd /  Doris Hart 5–7, 6–3, 7–5

Mixed doubles
 Louise Brough /   John Bromwich defeated  Gussie Moran /  Pancho Segura 6–3, 6–1

References

External links
Official US Open website

 
U.S. National Championships
U.S. National Championships (tennis) by year
U.S. National Championships
U.S. National Championships
U.S. National Championships